Ioan Andrei Vasile Dumiter, commonly known as Andrei Dumiter (born 10 April 1999) is a Romanian professional footballer who plays as winger and forward for Liga I side FC Voluntari .

Career statistics

Club

Honours
Sepsi OSK
Cupa României runner-up: 2019–20

References

External links
 

1999 births
Living people
Sportspeople from Timișoara
Romanian footballers
Association football forwards
Liga I players
Sepsi OSK Sfântu Gheorghe players
AFC Chindia Târgoviște players
Liga II players
FC Ripensia Timișoara players
FC Steaua București players
FC Voluntari players